Henriettea punctata is a species of plant in the family Melastomataceae. It is endemic to Cuba.

References

Endemic flora of Cuba
punctata
Vulnerable plants
Taxonomy articles created by Polbot